Radley Prescott Balko (born April 19, 1975) is an American journalist, author, blogger, and speaker who writes about criminal justice, the drug war, and civil liberties. In 2022, he began publishing his work on Substack after being let go from The Washington Post, where he had worked as an opinion columnist for nine years. Balko has written several books, including The Rise of the Warrior Cop and The Cadaver King and the Country Dentist.

Education and personal life
Balko earned a B.A. in journalism and political science in 1997 from Indiana University Bloomington.

Balko is an atheist.

Employment and publications
Balko blogs about criminal justice, the drug war, and civil liberties. He has worked as an opinion writer for The Washington Post, a senior writer and investigative reporter for The Huffington Post, a senior editor at Reason magazine, and a policy analyst for the Cato Institute, specializing in vice and civil liberties issues. He writes on drug policy, police misconduct, obesity, alcohol, tobacco, and civil liberties. He also writes on trade and globalization issues and more generally on politics and culture. He was also a biweekly columnist for Fox News from 2002 until 2009. His work has been published in The Wall Street Journal, Forbes, Playboy, TIME magazine, The Washington Post, the Los Angeles Times, Slate, Reason, Worth magazine, Canada's National Post, and the Chicago Tribune. He has appeared on CNN, CNBC, Fox News, MSNBC, and National Public Radio. He began writing an opinion blog at The Washington Post in January 2014.

Balko's work on "no-knock" drug raids was profiled in The New York Times, and cited by U.S. Supreme Court Justice Stephen Breyer in his dissent in Hudson v. Michigan. He is credited with breaking and reporting the Cory Maye case; his work on the Maye case was cited by the Mississippi Supreme Court. He has also written extensively about the Ryan Frederick case and the raid on Cheye Calvo's home.

Balko has advocated the abolition of laws criminalizing drunk driving, arguing that the "punishable act should be violating road rules or causing an accident, not the factors that led to those offenses. Singling out alcohol impairment for extra punishment isn't about making the roads safer".

He has expressed his position against the judicial policy of civil asset forfeiture, arguing that it is a "practice contrary to a basic sense of justice and fairness".

Balko has also authored two books on the topic of increasing militarization in police forces:
 Rise of the Warrior Cop: The Militarization of America's Police Forces (PublicAffairs), 2013.
 Overkill: The Rise of Paramilitary Police Raids in America (Cato Institute), 2006.

 Other books
 The Cadaver King and the Country Dentist New York : PublicAffairs, 2018. ,

Awards
In 2009, Balko's investigative report on expert witness fraud in a Louisiana death penalty case won the Western Publication Association's Maggie Award for reporting.

In 2011, The Week named Balko a finalist for Opinion Columnist of the Year. Also in 2011, the Los Angeles Press Club named Balko Best of Show Journalist of the Year, the judges saying:
Radley Balko is one of those throw-back journalists that understands the power of groundbreaking reporting and how to make a significant impact through his work. Time and time again, his stories cause readers to stop, think, and most significantly, take action.

References

External links

 The Watch, Balko's Washington Post blog
 The Agitator, Balko's personal blog, hosted by the Huffington Post
 
 Balko's columns at Fox News
 Overkill: The Rise of Paramilitary Police Raids in America by Radley Balko
 Video (and audio) conversation with Balko and David Freddoso on Bloggingheads.tv

1975 births
Living people
20th-century atheists
21st-century American journalists
21st-century American non-fiction writers
21st-century atheists
21st-century American male writers
American atheists
American columnists
American libertarians
American magazine editors
American male bloggers
American bloggers
HuffPost bloggers
American male journalists
American political writers
Cato Institute people
American drug policy reform activists
Indiana University Bloomington alumni
People from Greenfield, Indiana
The Washington Post journalists